Harpagus is a genus of birds of prey in the family Accipitridae. It comprises:

Both live in tropical American forest.  They are small, rather accipiter-like kites, 30 to 35 cm long and compact, with long tails and oval wings ("pinched in" near the base of the trailing edge) which they characteristically curve downward when soaring or gliding.  Both have dark tails with pale bars, as well as a white throat with a dark stripe down the middle.  Another shared feature is a blunt bill with two notches on each side of the upper mandible.  This "double tooth" gave rise not only to the common name of one species but to the specific epithets bidentatus and diodon.  Both like rather high perches in trees and sometimes soar above the forest.

Harpagus was the Greek name of a Median general.

References
 
 
 Peterson, Alan P. (Editor). 1999. Zoological Nomenclature Resource (Zoonomen). Accessed 2007-08-22.

 

Higher-level bird taxa restricted to the Neotropics